The Rangoon bombing of 9 October 1983, was an assassination attempt against Chun Doo-hwan, the fifth president of South Korea, in Rangoon, Burma (present-day Yangon, Myanmar). The attempt was orchestrated by North Korea. Although Chun survived, 21 people died in the attack and 46 were injured. One suspect was later killed, and the two other suspected bombers were captured, one of whom confessed to being a North Korean military officer.

Bombing
On 9 October 1983, President Chun Doo-hwan flew to Rangoon on an official visit to the capital of Burma. During the visit he planned to lay a wreath at the Martyrs' Mausoleum to commemorate Aung San, one of the founders of independent Burma who was assassinated in 1947.  As some of the president's staff began assembling at the mausoleum, one of three bombs concealed in the roof exploded.  The huge blast ripped through the crowd below, killing 21 people and wounding 46 others. Four senior South Korean politicians were killed: foreign minister Lee Beom-seok; minister of power resource, Suh Sang-chul; economic planning minister and deputy prime minister, Suh Suk-joon; and minister for commerce and industry, Kim Dong-hwi. Fourteen South Korean presidential advisers, journalists, and security officials were killed; four Burmese nationals, including three journalists, were also among the dead. President Chun was saved because his car had been delayed in traffic and was only minutes from arriving at the memorial. The bomb was reportedly detonated early because the presidential bugle which signalled Chun's arrival mistakenly rang out a few minutes ahead of schedule.

Perpetrators
Burmese police identified three suspects, a Korean People's Army major and two captains. A police investigation revealed that they had slipped off a ship docked in Rangoon port, and had received explosives in a North Korean diplomatic mission. Suspect Kang Min-chul and another attacker attempted to commit suicide by blowing themselves up with a hand grenade that same day, but survived and were arrested, although Kang lost his right arm while the other man, Kim Jin-su, lost both an eye and an arm. A third suspect, Shin Ki-chul, went missing, but was hunted down by a woman Darr Sann Ye and four men, including Bo Gyi and Shwe Min Thar. Shin managed to kill three soldiers before being shot dead. Kang Min-chul confessed his mission and links to North Korea, an action by which he was able to avoid a death sentence and instead received life imprisonment.  His colleague Kim Jin-su, who refused to confess or cooperate with investigations, was executed by hanging. North Korea denied any links to Kang, who was sent to Insein Prison, north of Rangoon.

Aftermath
The United States quietly provided military and logistics support to ensure that the surviving delegates and bodies of the deceased were safely returned to Korea. According to Victor Cha, an academic and former Director for Asian Affairs in the White House's National Security Council, a South Korean official recounted to him the sentiment that "this is what only a true ally like the United States was capable of doing, in ways that would never become public but would be remembered."

As a result of the bombing, Burma suspended diplomatic relations with North Korea. China, which had passed on a diplomatic note requesting trilateral talks between North and South Korea and the US on North Korea's behalf just prior to the bombing, reprimanded North Korea in the state media. Chinese officials refused to meet or talk with North Korean officials for months afterward.

In 1994, the representative of South Korea to the United Nations General Assembly linked this incident with the downing of Korean Air Flight 858, which he alleged was sponsored by the same government acting with impunity. As a result, North Korea has been listed as a state sponsor of terrorism ever since (except between 2008 and November 2017).

In 2013, Burmese president Thein Sein granted the South Korean government approval to build a cemetery near the mausoleum.

Kang's fate

One of the suspects, Kang Min-chul was Myanmar's longest-serving prisoner. He learned to speak the Burmese language fluently according to one of his fellow prisoners. He also learned to climb mango trees with one arm and converted to Christianity. Kang received the biblical name "Matthew" after an inmate baptized him. Yangon's moves towards resuming relations with North Korea led to speculation about what would happen to Kang.  Because North Korea denied that he was a North Korean citizen, he may have been considered a stateless person. Kang reportedly did not want to go to North Korea, which he believed considered him a traitor (because of his having revealed its criminal operations); or to South Korea, which might have tried him for his role in the assassination attempt. He also worried for the safety of his mother and sister back in North Korea.

In 2006, Chung Hyung-keun, a member of South Korea's Grand National Party and a former employee of South Korean intelligence, sponsored a bill to bring Kang to South Korea. Kang died of liver cancer on 18 May 2008 at the age of 53 while being transferred to the hospital from Insein Prison of Yangon. It was not known what happened to Kang's remains upon his death.

List of victims

 Suh Seok-jun (서석준, 1938–1983), Deputy Prime Minister
 Lee Beom-seok (이범석, 1925–1983), Minister of Foreign Affairs
 Kim Dong-hwi (김동휘), Minister of Commerce
 Suh Sang-chul (서상철), Minister of Power Resources
 Ham Byeong-chun (함병춘), Chief Presidential Secretary
 Lee Gye-cheol (이계철), Ambassador to Burma
 Kim Jae-ik (김재익, 1938–1983), Senior Presidential Secretary for Economic Affairs
 Ha Dong-seon (하동선), Planning Director of International Cooperation Committee
 Lee Gi-uk (이기욱), Vice Minister of Finance
 Gang In-hui (강인희), Vice Minister of Agriculture, Forest, Fishery
 Kim Yong-hwan (김용환), Vice Minister of Science and Technology
 Sim Sang-u (심상우, 1938–1983), a member of the National Assembly
 Min Byeong-seok (민병석), physician in attendance on the President
 Lee Jae-gwan (이재관), presidential press secretary
 Han Gyeong-hui (한경희), a presidential guard
 Jeong Tae-jin (정태진), a presidential guard
 Lee Jung-hyeon (이중현), reporter of The Dong-a Ilbo

See also

 North Korea's illicit activities
 Blue House Raid
 Sejong Institute

References

External links
 Brief summary from Onwar.com

20th century in Yangon
1983 murders in Myanmar
1983 in South Korea
1983 in North Korea
Improvised explosive device bombings in 1983
Failed assassination attempts in Asia
History of Myanmar (1948–present)
History of North Korea
History of South Korea
Improvised explosive device bombings in Asia
Mass murder in 1983
Myanmar–North Korea relations
North Korea–South Korea relations
Terrorist incidents in Asia in 1983
Terrorism committed by North Korea
October 1983 events in Asia
Filmed improvised explosive device bombings
State-sponsored terrorism
Terrorist incidents in Myanmar
Building bombings in Myanmar